The Four Postmen are an American rock band from Los Angeles, consisting of Ken Weiler (electric guitar, vocals), Matt Kaminsky (vocals, keyboards), Stefan Marks (acoustic guitar, vocals), Geoff Dunbar (drums), and Brett Pearsons (bass guitar).

History
The Four Postmen formed in 1992, and in 1996 signed a development deal with NBC Studios to create a TV show based on their group. The band has performed on NBC's Friday Night Videos, Fox's Futurama, MTV's Undressed, and has composed original music for NBC's Thrillogy Series as well as several independent feature films. They wrote original music for the feature film The Sky is Falling, and all band members were cast in the movie. They have released four full-length albums: U.S. Male (1993), Looking For Grandpa (1997), Hit Record (2001), and What The Hell Happened (2004).

On November 6, 2007, The Four Postmen headlined a fundraiser for Reading to Kids at the Temple Bar in Santa Monica.

Style
Featuring an emphasis on three-part vocal harmony, their live shows are highly theatrical, and feature numerous comic interludes. The band are sometimes compared to Barenaked Ladies, and have been described by GQ Magazine as "The Seinfeldesque Monkees".

Members
 Ken Weiler - "Postman #1" - Vocals/Electric Guitar
 Matt Kaminsky - "Postman #2" - Vocals/Keyboards
 Stefan Marks - "Postman #3" - Vocals/Acoustic Guitar
 Geoff Dunbar - "Postman #4" - Drums
 Brett Pearsons - "Postman #5" - Bass

Discography

U.S. Male (1993)
 There Are Things
 Dragon
 Are Ya Listnin'?
 I Asked You
 I Always Wanted To Be...
 Sun
 Indian
 Yes I'm Lucky
 All I Know Is I Like You
 Blood Suckin' Postman
 31 Cents
 Praise
 I'm Your Man
 Red Hot Rap
 Miles & Miles
 Farm Boys
 Hazy Day
 Fish
 Used To... I Don't Know
 Mailman Song
 Rabbit Valley

Looking For Grandpa (1997)
 Where's My River?
 In The Pouch of a Kangaroo
 Four Years of High School Spanish
 The Lobster Quadrille
 The Pied Piper
 I've Gotta Tan...
 What I Am
 Indian
 She's 17...
 I Wanna Dance
 It's All About Me
 Catbox
 Baby Jesus
 What Can I Do?
 I Bought You Dinner...
 Rabbit Valley
 I'm Your Man
 Lost Vegas

Hit Record (2001)
 Sleep
 What's Your Favrit #, Baby?
 Pornostar
 Now
 (The) Chainsaw Juggler
 Dinner Of Love
 Gentleman A
 I'd Have To Be Drunk
 I Got My Eye On You
 I Want My Money Back
 Let Me Make You Smile In Bed
 M-A-L-E Man
 She Is Walking Away
 Something To Squeeze
 There Are Things
 When Man Was A Monkey
 Why? How? Who?
 (The) Horrible Movie Song

What the Hell Happened? (2004)
 The Three Postmen
 Corn
 Forgive Me, Love
 No Banjo!
 The Dirty Show
 A Gentleman's Heart
 I Asked You
 Joke Band
 Girl Take Me From Behind
 The Lemon Tree
 Thump
 Co-Dependent
 Geoff Speaks
 The Drinking Song
 The Underwear Song
 A Piece of Ass
 I'm Gonna Die
 My Christian Love
 No One Thinks the Way I Do
 Thanks
 Get Off The Stage!

″5-Pack: Volume 1″ (2007)
 The Karaoke King
 Bed A' Nails
 Drivin' Me
 Coffee Girl
 Parachute

″5-Pak: Vol. 2″ (2012)
 Man V Woman
 Dr. Tell Me
 Bug
 Bloodline
 Procrastinate
 Assembly Line

References

External links 
Official Site

Rock music groups from California
Musical groups from Los Angeles
Musical groups established in 1992